Twelve Inch Anthology is a compilation album by Skinny Puppy.  It contains most of the band's early singles and B-sides.  The CD is currently out of print but still available for download.  The cover design is a collage of previous Steven R Gilmore covers.

Another B-side compilation was released in 1999 as B-Sides Collect complementing the tracks found here with the exception of "Serpents".

Track listing

A rare cassette version of the compilation exists that contains the songs "Addiction (Second Dose)" and "Testure (S.F.Mix)".

References

External links 
Twelve Inch Anthology at Discogs (Cd, Nettwerk)
Twelve Inch Anthology at Discogs (12", Nettwerk)

1990 compilation albums
Skinny Puppy compilation albums
1990 remix albums
Skinny Puppy remix albums
Nettwerk Records compilation albums
Nettwerk Records remix albums